Alila may refer to:

 Alila (film), a 2003 Israeli drama film
 Alila Hotels and Resorts, a hotel chain

See also
 Alilah, Iran